Metabolic acidosis is a serious electrolyte disorder characterized by an imbalance in the body's acid-base balance. Metabolic acidosis has three main root causes: increased acid production, loss of bicarbonate, and a reduced ability of the kidneys to excrete excess acids. Metabolic acidosis can lead to acidemia, which is defined as arterial blood pH that is lower than 7.35. Acidemia and acidosis are not mutually exclusive – pH and hydrogen ion concentrations also depend on the coexistence of other acid-base disorders; therefore, pH levels in people with metabolic acidosis can range from low to high.

Acute metabolic acidosis, lasting from minutes to several days, often occurs during serious illnesses or hospitalizations, and is generally caused when the body produces an excess amount of organic acids (ketoacids in ketoacidosis, or lactic acid in lactic acidosis). A state of chronic metabolic acidosis, lasting several weeks to years, can be the result of impaired kidney function (chronic kidney disease) and/or bicarbonate wasting. The adverse effects of acute versus chronic metabolic acidosis also differ, with acute metabolic acidosis impacting the cardiovascular system in hospital settings, and chronic metabolic acidosis affecting muscles, bones, kidney and cardiovascular health.

Signs and symptoms

Acute metabolic acidosis 
Symptoms are not specific, and diagnosis can be difficult unless patients present with clear indications for blood gas sampling. Symptoms may include palpitations, headache, altered mental status such as severe anxiety due to hypoxia, decreased visual acuity, nausea, vomiting, abdominal pain, altered appetite and weight gain, muscle weakness, bone pain, and joint pain. People with acute metabolic acidosis may exhibit deep, rapid breathing called Kussmaul respirations which is classically associated with diabetic ketoacidosis. Rapid deep breaths increase the amount of carbon dioxide exhaled, thus lowering the serum carbon dioxide levels, resulting in some degree of compensation. Overcompensation via respiratory alkalosis to form an alkalemia does not occur.

Extreme acidemia can also lead to neurological and cardiac complications:

Neurological: lethargy, stupor, coma, seizures
 Cardiac: Abnormal heart rhythms (e.g., ventricular tachycardia) and decreased response to epinephrine, both leading to low blood pressure

Physical examination can occasionally reveal signs of the disease, but is often otherwise normal. Cranial nerve abnormalities are reported in ethylene glycol poisoning, and retinal edema can be a sign of methanol intoxication.

Chronic metabolic acidosis 
Chronic metabolic acidosis has non-specific clinical symptoms but can be readily diagnosed by testing serum bicarbonate levels in patients with Chronic Kidney Disease (CKD) as part of a comprehensive metabolic panel. Patients with CKD Stages G3-G5 should be routinely screened for metabolic acidosis.

Diagnostic approach and causes
Metabolic acidosis results in a reduced serum pH that is due to metabolic and not respiratory dysfunction. Typically the serum bicarbonate concentration will be <22 mEq/L, below the normal range of 22 to 29 mEq/L, the standard base will be more negative than -2 (base deficit) and the pCO2 will be reduced as a result of hyperventilation in an attempt to restore the pH closer to normal. Ocasionally in a mixed acid-base disorder where metabolic acidosis is not the primary disorder present, the pH may be normal or high. In the absence of chronic respiratory alkalosis, metabolic acidosis can be clinically diagnosed by analysis of the calculated serum bicarbonate level.

Causes 
Generally, metabolic acidosis occurs when the body produces too much acid (e.g., lactic acidosis, see below section), there is a loss of bicarbonate from the blood, or when the kidneys are not removing enough acid from the body.

Chronic metabolic acidosis is most often caused by a decreased capacity of the kidneys to excrete excess acids through renal ammoniagenesis. The typical Western diet generates 75-100 mEq of acid daily, and individuals with normal kidney function increase the production of ammonia to get rid of this dietary acid. As kidney function declines, the tubules lose the ability to excrete excess acid, and this results in buffering of acid using serum bicarbonate, as well as bone and muscle stores.

There are many causes of acute metabolic acidosis, and thus it is helpful to group them by the presence or absence of a normal anion gap.

Increased anion gap
Causes of increased anion gap include: 
 Lactic acidosis
 Ketoacidosis (e.g., Diabetic, alcoholic, or starvation)
 Chronic kidney failure
 Transient 5-oxoprolinemia due to long-term ingestion of high-doses of acetaminophen (often seen with sepsis, liver failure, kidney failure, or malnutrition)
 Intoxication:
Salicylates, methanol, ethylene glycol
Organic acids, paraldehyde, ethanol, formaldehyde
Carbon monoxide, cyanide, ibuprofen, metformin
 Propylene glycol (metabolized to L and D-lactate and is often found in infusions for certain intravenous medications used in the intensive care unit)
 Massive rhabdomyolysis
Isoniazid, iron, phenelzine, tranylcypromine, valproic acid, verapamil
Topiramate
Sulfates

Normal anion gap
Causes of normal anion gap include

 Inorganic acid addition
 Infusion/ingestion of HCl, 
 Gastrointestinal base loss
Diarrhea
 Small bowel fistula/drainage
 Surgical diversion of urine into gut loops
 Renal base loss/acid retention: 
 Proximal renal tubular acidosis
 Distal renal tubular acidosis
Hyperalimentation
Addison disease
Acetazolamide
Spironolactone
 Saline infusion

To distinguish between the main types of metabolic acidosis, a clinical tool called the anion gap is very useful. The anion gap is calculated by subtracting the sum of the serum concentrations of major anions, chloride and bicarbonate, from the serum concentration of the major cation, sodium. (The serum potassium concentration may be added to the calculation, but this merely changes the normal reference range for what is considered a normal anion gap)

Because the concentration of serum sodium is greater than the combined concentrations of chloride and bicarbonate an 'anion gap' is noted. In reality serum is electoneutral because of the presence of other minor cations (potassium, calcium and magnesium) and anions (albumin, sulphate and phosphate) that are not measured in the equation that calculates the anion gap.

The normal value for the anion gap is 8–16 mmol/L (12±4). An elevated anion gap (i.e. > 16 mmol/L) indicates the presence of excess 'unmeasured' anions, such as lactic acid in anaerobic metabolism resulting from tissue hypoxia, glycolic and formic acid produced by the metabolism of toxic alcohols, ketoacids produced when acetyl-CoA undergoes ketogenesis rather than entering the tricarboxylic (Krebs) cycle, and failure of renal excretion of products of metabolism such as sulphates and phosphates.

Adjunctive tests are useful in determining the aetiology of a raised anion gap metabolic acidosis including detection of an osmolar gap indicative of the presence of a toxic alcohol, measurement of serum ketones indicative of ketoacidosis and renal function tests and urinanalysis to detect renal dysfunction.

Elevated protein (albumin, globulins) may theoretically increase the anion gap but high levels are not usually encountered clinically. Hypoalbuminaemia, which is frequently encountered clinically, will mask an anion gap. As a rule of thumb, a decrease in serum albumin by 1G/L will decrease the anion gap by 0.25 mmol/L

Pathophysiology

Compensatory mechanisms
Thus demonstrating the importance of maintaining balance between acids and bases in the body for maintaining optimal functioning of organs, tissues and cells.

The body regulates the acidity of the blood by four buffering mechanisms.

 Bicarbonate buffering system 
 Intracellular buffering by absorption of hydrogen atoms by various molecules, including proteins, phosphates and carbonate in bone.
 Respiratory compensation. Hyperventilation will cause more carbon dioxide to be removed from the body and thereby increases pH. 
 Kidney compensation

Buffer
The decreased bicarbonate that distinguishes metabolic acidosis is therefore due to two separate processes: the buffer (from water and carbon dioxide) and additional renal generation. The buffer reactions are:

H+ + HCO3- <=> H2CO3 <=> CO2 + H2O

The Henderson-Hasselbalch equation mathematically describes the relationship between blood pH and the components of the bicarbonate buffering system:

Using Henry's law, we can say that [] = 0.03 × Pa
Adding the other normal values, we get

Consequences

Acute Metabolic Acidosis 
Acute Metabolic Acidosis most often occurs during hospitalizations, and acute critical illnesses. It is often associated with poor prognosis, with a mortality rate as high as 57% if the pH remains untreated at 7.20. At lower pH levels, acute metabolic acidosis can lead to impaired circulation and end organ function.

Chronic Metabolic Acidosis 
Chronic metabolic acidosis commonly occurs in people with Chronic Kidney Disease with an eGFR of less than 45 ml/min/1.73m2, most often with mild to moderate severity; however, metabolic acidosis can manifest earlier on in the course of Chronic Kidney Disease. Multiple animal and human studies have shown that metabolic acidosis in Chronic Kidney Disease, given its chronic nature, has a profound adverse impact on cellular function, overall contributing to high morbidities in patients.

The most adverse consequences of chronic metabolic acidosis in people with Chronic Kidney Disease and in particular, for those who have end-stage renal disease (ESRD), are detrimental changes to the bones and muscles. Acid buffering leads to loss of bone density, resulting in an increased risk of bone fractures, renal osteodystrophy, and bone disease; as well, increased protein catabolism leads to muscle wasting. Furthermore, metabolic acidosis in Chronic Kidney Disease is also associated with a reduction in eGFR; it is both a complication of Chronic Kidney Disease, as well as an underlying cause of Chronic Kidney Disease progression.

Treatment
Treatment of metabolic acidosis depends on the underlying cause, and should target reversing the main process. When considering course of treatment, it is important to distinguish between acute versus chronic forms.

Acute Metabolic Acidosis 
Bicarbonate therapy is generally administered In patients with severe acute acidemia (pH < 7.11), or with less severe acidemia (pH 7.1-7.2) who have severe acute kidney injury. Bicarbonate therapy is not recommended for people with less severe acidosis (pH ≥ 7.1), unless severe acute kidney injury is present. In the BICAR-ICU trial, bicarbonate therapy for maintaining a pH >7.3 had no overall effect on the composite outcome of all-cause mortality and the presence of at least one organ failure at day 7. However, amongst the sub-group of patients with severe acute kidney injury, bicarbonate therapy significantly decreased the primary composite outcome, and 28-day mortality, along with the need for dialysis.

Chronic Metabolic Acidosis 
For people with Chronic Kidney Disease, treating metabolic acidosis slows the progression of chronic kidney disease. Dietary interventions for treatment of chronic metabolic acidosis include base-inducing fruits and vegetables that assist with reducing the urine net acid excretion, and increase TCO2. Recent research has also suggested that dietary protein restriction, through ketoanalogue-supplemented vegetarian very low protein diets are also a nutritionally safe option for correction of metabolic acidosis in people with Chronic Kidney Disease.

Currently, the most commonly used treatment for chronic metabolic acidosis is oral bicarbonate. The NKF/KDOQI guidelines recommend starting treatment when serum bicarbonate levels are <22 mEq/L, in order to maintain levels ≥ 22 mEq/L. Studies investigating the effects of oral alkali therapy demonstrated improvements in serum bicarbonate levels, resulting in a slower decline in kidney function, and reduction in proteinuria – leading to a reduction in the risk of progressing to kidney failure. However, side effects of oral alkali therapy include gastrointestinal intolerance, worsening edema, and worsening hypertension. Furthermore, large doses of oral alkali are required to treat chronic metabolic acidosis, and the pill burden can limit adherence.

Veverimer (TRC 101) is a promising investigational drug designed to treat metabolic acidosis by binding with the acid in the gastrointestinal tract and removing it from the body through excretion in the feces, in turn decreasing the amount of acid in the body, and increasing the level of bicarbonate in the blood. Results from a Phase 3, double-blind placebo-controlled 12-week clinical trial in people with CKD and metabolic acidosis demonstrated that Veverimer effectively and safely corrected metabolic acidosis in the short-term, and a blinded, placebo-controlled, 40-week extension of the trial assessing long-term safety, demonstrated sustained improvements in physical function and a combined endpoint of death, dialysis, or 50% decline in eGFR.

See also
 Delta ratio
 Metabolic alkalosis
 Respiratory acidosis
 Respiratory alkalosis
 Trauma triad of death
 Winters' formula
 Intravenous bicarbonate

References

External links

Acid–base disturbances